Juliet Obanda Makanga (née Juliet Obanda) is a Kenyan pharmacologist, neuroscientist and medical researcher, who works as a Lecturer in Clinical Pharmacology, at the School of Pharmacy of Kenyatta University, in Kahawa, Nairobi.

Background and education
Juliet Obanda was born in Vihiga County in the south-western part of Kenya, on 19 February 1985. She attended Alliance Girls High School in the town of Kikuyu, in Kiambu County, in the central part of Kenya, where she obtained her High School Diploma, in 2002.

In 2003, she was awarded the Japanese Government Monbukagakusho Scholarship (MEXT Scholarship), to study pharmacy in Japan. She spent her first year in Japan at the Tokyo University of Foreign Studies, where she obtained a certificate of proficiency in the Japanese language.

She then transferred to Kanazawa University in the city of Kanazawa, in the Ishikawa Prefecture, in Chūbu region, on the Honshu Island (Main Island) of Japan. She spent the next eleven years at the university's Institute of Medical, Pharmaceutical and Health Sciences, where she graduated with a Bachelor of Pharmaceutical Sciences, in 2008, an MSc in Pharmaceutical Sciences in 2010 and a PhD in Pharmaceutical Sciences in 2015.

Career
While pursuing her doctorate in Japan, between 2010 and 2015, she worked as a teaching assistant and research associate at the College of Pharmaceutical Sciences of Ritsumeikan University, at the Biwako-Kusatsu Campus, in the town of Kusatsu, in Shiga Prefecture, Japan.

Upon her return to Kenya in 2015, she was hired by Kabarak University, in Nakuru, where she served as the founding head of department of pharmacy and was a key figure in the establishment of the university's Bachelor of Pharmacy programme. In October 2017, she transferred to Kenyatta University as a lecturer at their School of Pharmacy.

Her area of research interest is stem cell research. It is her goal to generate a uniquely "Kenyan" stem cell line.

Other considerations
In 2018, Business Daily Africa, a Kenyan daily English newspaper named Makanga, one of the Top 40 Under 40 Kenyan Women for the year 2018. Makanga is a married mother with one daughter, born .

See also
 Susane Nabulindo
 Shitsama Nyamweya
 Maureen Kimenye

References

External links
 Juliet O. Makanga at Google Scholar
 Dr. Juliet Makanga at Kenyatta University

Living people
1985 births
Kenyan scientists
Kenyan pharmacologists
Tokyo University of Foreign Studies alumni
Kanazawa University alumni
Alumni of Alliance Girls High School
People from Vihiga County
21st-century Kenyan women scientists
21st-century Kenyan scientists